Semyon Aleksandrovich Fedotov (born 2 March 1992) is a Russian professional football player.

Club career
He made his professional debut for PFC CSKA Moscow on 15 December 2010 in a 2010–11 UEFA Europa League game against AC Sparta Prague. He made his Russian Premier League debut for CSKA on 15 October 2011 in a game against FC Terek Grozny.

References

External links
 
 

1992 births
People from Vladimir, Russia
Living people
Russian footballers
Russia youth international footballers
Russia under-21 international footballers
Association football defenders
PFC CSKA Moscow players
FC KAMAZ Naberezhnye Chelny players
FC Dynamo Saint Petersburg players
JK Sillamäe Kalev players
FC Khimik Dzerzhinsk players
FC Lokomotiv Moscow players
FC SKA Rostov-on-Don players
Russian Premier League players
Russian First League players
Russian Second League players
Meistriliiga players
Russian expatriate footballers
Russian expatriate sportspeople in Estonia
Expatriate footballers in Estonia
FC Torpedo Vladimir players
Sportspeople from Vladimir Oblast